The Aegean and Western Turkey sclerophyllous and mixed forests is an ecoregion in the lands around the Aegean Sea. The ecoregion covers most of mainland Greece, the Greek Aegean Islands (except for Crete), the western coast of Turkey, the southern Vardar river valley in North Macedonia, the southern Struma river valley at the extreme south-western corner of Bulgaria.

The ecoregion has a Mediterranean climate, and is in the Mediterranean forests, woodlands, and scrub biome.

Flora
The predominant plant communities are maquis, low shrublands, and pine forests. 

Maquis is woody shrubland characterized by low trees, shrubs, and herbaceous plants. Maquis species include strawberry tree (Arbutus unedo), Arbutus andrachne, sweet bay (Laurus nobilis), olive (Olea europaea), carob (Ceratonia siliqua), Erica arborea, and Spartium junceum. Maquis includes many aromatic plants, particularly species in the mint family (Lamiaceae).

Low shrublands, known in Greek as phrygana, are characterized by low aromatic shrubs and herbs, including Euphorbia acanthothamnos, Thymus capitatus, and species of Ballota, Cistus, Helichrysum, Phlomis, and Salvia. Phrygana is common on limestone (calcareous) soils, and in areas subject to frequent fires and heavy grazing.<ref>Filippi, Olivier (2019). Bringing the Mediterranean into your Garden". Filbert Press, 2019.</ref>

Kermes oak (Quercus coccifera) and holm oak (Quercus ilex) are found in maquis, and also form oak woodlands.

Forests of Turkish pine (Pinus brutia) occur in Anatolia, forests of Aleppo pine (Pinus halepensis) are found in central Greece and the Peloponnese and Stone pine (Pinus pinea) grows on stabilized coastal dunes on the Peloponnese.

The oriental sweetgum (Liquidambar orientalis) is endemic to a limited area of southwestern Turkey and the island of Rhodes. The largest remaining stands are near Köyceğiz.

Fauna
Mammals in the ecoregion include wild boar (Sus scrofa), red fox (Vulpes vulpes), golden jackal (Canis aureus), wolf (C. lupus), European badger (Meles meles), European hare (Lepus europaeus), northern white-breasted hedgehog (Erinaceus roumanicus), southern white-breasted hedgehog (Erinaceus concolor), Eurasian red squirrel (Sciurus vulgaris), Caucasian squirrel (Sciurus anomalus), and pine marten (Martes martes). The Eurasian lynx (Lynx lynx), European wildcat (Felis sylvestris), and brown bear (Ursus arctos) are now rare in the ecoregion.

The ecoregion is important habitat for several limited-range bird species, including the eastern olivaceous warbler (Hippolais pallida), olive-tree warbler (Hippolais olivetorum), Rüppell's warbler (Curruca rueppelli), masked shrike (Lanius nubicus), cinereous bunting (Emberiza cineracea), and Cretzschmar's bunting (Emberiza caesia).

Characteristic birds of the maquis include the red-legged partridge (Alectoris rufa), rock partridge (A. graeca), chukar partridge (A. chukar), eastern subalpine warbler (Sylvia cantillans), Rüppell's warbler (Curruca ruppeli), cirl bunting (Emberiza cirlus), rock bunting (E. cia), and black-headed bunting (E. melanocephala).

Krüper's nuthatch (Sitta krueperi) is associated with Turkish pine forests in the ecoregion and neighboring ones. Other birds of the pine forests include common European forest species like the Eurasian wren (Troglodytes troglodytes), common blackbird (Turdus merula), common chiffchaff (Phylloscopus collybita), coal tit (Periparus ater), Eurasian blue tit (Cyanistes caeruleus), great tit (Parus major), short-toed treecreeper (Certhia brachydactyla), Eurasian jay (Garrulus glandarius), and common chaffinch (Fringilla coelebs).

Birds associated with the liquidambar forests of western Anatolia include the common nightingale (Luscinia megarhyncos), olivaceous warbler, and Cetti's warbler (Cettia cetti'').

Protected areas
As of 2017, 23,189 km², or 18%, of the ecoregion was in protected areas. Protected areas in Greece include Otea, Parnassus, Parnitha, and Sounion national parks. Protected areas in Turkey include Dilek Peninsula-Büyük Menderes Delta, Marmaris, and Spil Dağı national parks, and Köyceğiz-Dalyan Special Environmental Protection Area.

External links

References

Aegean Sea
Natural history of Anatolia
Biota of Bulgaria
Biota of Greece
Biota of Turkey
Ecoregions of Asia
Ecoregions of Bulgaria
Ecoregions of Europe
Ecoregions of Greece
Ecoregions of North Macedonia
Ecoregions of Turkey
Mediterranean forests, woodlands, and scrub
Palearctic ecoregions
Ecoregions of the Mediterranean Basin
Sclerophyll forests